{{DISPLAYTITLE:C15H20O3}} 
The molecular formula C15H20O3 (molar mass: 248.32 g/mol, exact mass: 248.1412 u) may refer to:

 Abscisic aldehyde
 Amiloxate
 Parthenolide
 Periplanone B

Molecular formulas